Per Oskar Andersen (12 January 1930 – 17 February 2020) was a Norwegian brain researcher at the University of Oslo. Research by his lab, specifically by Terje Lømo (and Timothy Bliss, who helped characterize the phenomenon years later), led to the discovery of long-term potentiation in 1966.

He was a fellow of the Norwegian Academy of Science and Letters and the Royal Society. He held honorary degrees at the University of Zürich and the University of Stockholm.

He resided in Blommenholm.

References

1930 births
2020 deaths
Norwegian neuroscientists
Academic staff of the University of Oslo
Members of the Norwegian Academy of Science and Letters
Foreign Members of the Royal Society
Foreign associates of the National Academy of Sciences
Members of the Royal Swedish Academy of Sciences